Troller Run is a stream in Thurston County in the U.S. state of Washington. It is a tributary to the Skookumchuck River.

Troller Run has the name of the local Troller family which settled near its course.

References

Rivers of Thurston County, Washington
Rivers of Washington (state)